Anne Murray's Greatest Hits is the second compilation album by the Canadian country pop artist of the same name, released in 1980 via Capitol Records. It is a collection of nine previously issued singles released between 1970 and 1980, as well as one new track, "Could I Have This Dance", which was newly recorded for this album (and simultaneously appeared on the soundtrack to the film  Urban Cowboy).

Though Murray's fourth compilation album, Greatest Hits was the first collection of her biggest charting singles, from her breakthrough Top 10 smash, "Snowbird", through 1980.  (Previous compilations had included some of Murray's chart hits along with album tracks and lesser known songs.)  It peaked at #16 on the Billboard album chart, hit #2 (where it held for nine weeks) on the Top Country Albums chart, and is certified 4× Multi-Platinum by the RIAA in the United States – Anne's biggest selling career disc.

Track listing

Charts

Weekly charts

Year-end charts

Certifications

References

1980 greatest hits albums
Anne Murray compilation albums
Capitol Records compilation albums
Juno Award for Album of the Year albums